The Second Battle of Kosovo (Hungarian: második rigómezei csata, Turkish: İkinci Kosova Muharebesi) was a land battle between a Hungarian-led Crusader army and the Ottoman Empire at Kosovo field that took place from 17–20 October 1448. It was the culmination of a Hungarian offensive to avenge the defeat at Varna four years earlier. In the three-day battle the Ottoman army under the command of Sultan Murad II defeated the Crusader army of regent John Hunyadi. 

After that battle, the path was clear for the Turks to conquer Serbia and the other Balkan States, it also ended any hopes of saving Constantinople. The Hungarian kingdom no longer had the military and financial resources to mount an offensive against the Ottomans. With the end of the half-century-long Crusader threat to their European frontier, Murad's son Mehmed II was free to lay siege to Constantinople in 1453.

Background
In 1444, the Hungarian king, Władysław III of Poland, in breach of a ten-year truce that existed with the Ottoman Empire following the Peace of Szeged, launched a new crusade. Meeting the Ottoman forces at the Battle of Varna, the crusading army was destroyed and the king was killed. Two years later in 1446, Sultan Murad II returned to the Balkans seeking revenge for the treaty breaking that preceded the battle. That year his army conquered the Peloponnese then, after the proclamation of a new crusade by Pope Nicholas V, Murad, invaded Albania. Four years after his defeat at Varna, John Hunyadi, the richest landowner in Hungary joined forces with Albania's war leader Gjergj Skanderbeg in an alliance that also included Serbia and Bosnia. Resolved to defeat the Ottoman army Hunyadi raised an army of 24,000 men, including 8,000 Wallachians, his Hungarian cavalry supplemented by German and Bohemian infantry mercenaries. Hunyadi's strategy was based on an expected revolt of the Balkan people, a surprise attack, and the destruction of the main force of the Ottomans in a single battle after linking up with his allies.

In September 1448, Hunyadi led his forces across the Danube and camped them in Serbia next to Kovin, just outside the Serbian capital of Smederevo. For a full month the Hungarians stayed encamped awaiting their German, Wallachians, Bohemian and Albanian allies. The Albanian army under Skanderbeg was delayed as it was prevented from linking with Hunyadi's army by the Ottomans and their allies. It is believed that the Albanian army was delayed by Serbian despot Đurađ Branković, whose army occupied the mountain passes on the Serbian-Albanian border and by a Venetian attack on northern Albania. The Serbs had declined joining Hunyadi's forces following an earlier truce with the Turks. Branković's exact role is disputed. As a result, Skanderbeg ravaged and pillaged Branković's domains as punishment for deserting the Christian cause. Hunyadi decided not to wait for Skanderbeg and his reinforcements to open the battle.

Battle
The Crusaders, numbering 22,000-30,000 arrived at Kosovo Field (the site of the first Battle of Kosovo in 1389, between Serbs and Ottomans) having faced an Ottoman army of 40,000-60,000 men Sultan Murad personally commanded a large section of cannons and janissaries, while his son and would-be successor, 16-year-old Mehmed, who faced battle for the first time, led the Anatolian troops at the right wing. Hunyadi commanded the center of his army in the battle, while the Crusaders right wing was under the Wallachians. The Hungarians had long barrage cannons. Calculating that he would need more than 40,000 men to defeat the Ottomans, the Hungarian regent sought to join up with anti-Ottoman Albanian forces, possibly led by Skanderbeg. The Ottomans in their base at Sofia received word of the Crusader army's march route and subsequently began readying their men.

Having failed to locate the main Ottoman army, whom he believed to still be at their capital in Edirne, Hunyadi was caught by surprise on 17 October when the Ottoman army appeared in front of his men at Kosovo Field. He constructed a tabor wagon fort at Plementina hill from which to fight the Ottomans, who built their own stockade in response. The battle opened when Hunyadi attacked the Ottoman flanks with mixed cavalry (light and heavy). The Turkish flanks, consisting of soldiers from Rumelia and Anatolia, were losing until Turkish light cavalry arrived to reinforce them. Cavalry skirmishing on the flanks of the stockades during the first two days and a Crusader night-time attack using their wagons and guns against the Sultan's central position on the night of 18/19 October produced much bloodshed but no conclusive results. The Christian flanks were subsequently routed and the survivors retreated back to Hunyadi's main force. On 19 October Murad II used his sipahi cavalry from Thessaly to envelop the cavalry on the Crusader left flank, along with a general assault all along the line to distract Hunyadi from the primary effort. The manoeuvre worked and the Wallachian, Moldavian, and Hungarian cavalry were cut down by the sipahis, who took no prisoners. 

When Hunyadi saw the defeat of his flanks, he attacked with his main force, composed of knights and light infantry. The janissary corps were not successful; the cavalry made progress through the Turkish centre but were stopped at the Turkish camp. When the main attack was halted, the Turkish infantry regrouped and successfully drove the Hungarian knights back. The light cavalry, who were now without the knights' support, was also overcome. Much of the Crusader army then retreated to their camp. On 20 October, the Wallachians deserted to the Ottoman side after being offered terms from Murad, leaving Hunyadi mostly defenceless.

With Murad II personally observing the struggle, the Janissaries attacked and killed everyone left in the stockade. Hunyadi fled, but was later captured by the Serbs. During the night, Turkish infantry fired missiles at the Hungarians, who replied with cannons. On the next day, a final assault destroyed the remaining Hungarian army.

Aftermath
The Christian Balkan states were unable to resist the Ottomans after this defeat, eventually falling one after the others under control of the Ottoman Empire. Hunyadi was captured by Branković in retaliation for the damage perpetrated by the Hungarian army in Serbia. Hunyadi's release was negotiated against a ransom of 100,000 florins, the return of the domains that Hunyadi had revocated from Branković, and the engagement of Hunyadi's heir to Branković's daughter, other sources cite the restitution of the despot’s estates in Hungary while leaving Hunyadi's elder son László at Smederevo as a hostage. For the remainder of his reign Hunyadi successfully defended the Kingdom of Hungary against Ottoman campaigns. As punishment for lending its support to Hunyad, Murad attacked and submitted Wallachia in 1449, followed by Albania in 1450 where Skanderbeg continued to resist, breaking Murad's siege of the Castle of Krujë in 1451. That year Murad died replaced by his 19-year-old son Mehmed II who, after securing Constantinople in 1453, launched a new military campaign against Serbia in 1454.

Notes

References

Citations

Bibliography

External links
 Second Battle of Kosovo – The Encyclopædia Britannica
 

Battles involving the Ottoman Empire
Kosovo
Battles involving Hungary in the Middle Ages
Battles involving Serbia in the Middle Ages
Battles involving Wallachia
History of Kosovo
1448 in Europe
Battles of the Ottoman–Hungarian Wars
1448 in the Ottoman Empire
Conflicts in 1448
Battles of Mehmed the Conqueror